Zip 'n Zoo is a 2008 film directed by Bruce Robertson and starring John Hannah, Simone Lahbib and Remy Bennett. The name of the film is derived from the sound of casting during fly-fishing.

Plot 
Fly-fishing expert, prize fiddle player and local school teacher Tom (John Hannah) and his wife Marion (Simone Lahbib) share an idyllic life in the Highlands, with only a baby to wish for.   When 19-year-old New Yorker Natalie (Remy Bennett) arrives in town claiming to be Tom’s daughter, the village gets more than the odd tune to entertain them.

Production 
Zip 'n Zoo was filmed in the landscape of Assynt in Sutherland, north west Scotland. The mountains of Quinag, Canisp, Suilven, Cùl Mòr, Stac Pollaidh and Ben More Assynt provide the backdrop for the opening sequence. The sequences in the shop, pub and school were filmed in the village of Drumbeg, and the fishing scenes on Loch Drumbeg.  Sequences were also filmed in the nearby village of Culkein Drumbeg. The scenes in Durness are Loch Croispol Bookshop and The John Lennon Memorial Garden.

External links 
 Zip 'n Zoo Website
 

2000s English-language films